Spin Off: From the Witness is the first single album by South Korean boy band Ateez. It was released on December 30, 2022, through KQ Entertainment. The album consists of five tracks, including the lead single "Halazia".

Track listing

Charts

Weekly charts

Monthly charts

Year-end charts

Accolades

Certifications

References

2022 EPs
Ateez albums
Korean-language EPs